Eastern Iowa Airport  is in Cedar Rapids, Iowa, on Wright Brothers Boulevard on the south edge of town,  west of Interstate 380.

Airline service 

The airport has been served almost entirely by regional jets, but also sees Delta use Airbus A320s that fly to Atlanta, as well as United with Airbus A320s and Boeing 737s to Denver International Airport and  O'Hare International Airport.  American has recently upgraded flights in 2022 on Airbus A319s and Airbus A320s to Charlotte, Dallas and Phoenix.  Delta uses mostly regional jets to Minneapolis, although the size will increase on most flights there to 70–76 seats with first-class cabins, while Allegiant and Frontier fly Airbus A320 family aircraft. The airport sees five airlines with non-stop flights to fifteen airports. The airport has nine gates on the upper concourse with jet bridge boarding. The airport used to be divided into two concourses, designated (B) and (C). After the renovation, all the B gates were removed and three new gates were added in addition to the C gates. The gates lost their "C" designation and became gates 4–9. The new gates 1–3 serve Delta and Frontier.

Arriving passengers have a short walk to the baggage claim area. Several national rental car company counters and a courtesy shuttle counter are in this area.

On July 8, 2016, the airport announced new twice-daily service from CID to Charlotte. The service started on November 4, 2016, and is flown on CRJ-700/900s by PSA Airlines, later upgraded to CRJ900 aircraft and currently now all Mainline Airbus Aircraft for American Airlines. On December 18, 2019, American Airlines began daily seasonal service from CID to Phoenix, which became daily year round service as of June 2021. This route used to be flown on CRJ900 aircraft and now is on Airbus 319 aircraft as of November 2022

Runway reconstruction 
On June 3, 2010, runway 9/27 closed for reconstruction, reopening on September 23. A temporary runway had been set up parallel to the closed runway. Beginning July 3, 2010, and lasting for four weeks, Runway 13/31 was also closed as they rebuilt the intersection with Runway 9/27.

History 
Cedar Rapids' first airport was Hunter Field, a private airport established by Dan Hunter in the 1920s on Bowling Street SW north of U.S. Highway 30. The airport was used for private charter service, pilot training, and airmail, but it was unusable during bad weather.

Cedar Rapids Municipal Airport was completed with military funding in 1944 but was not dedicated until April 27, 1947. The Cedar Rapids Parks Department operated the airport until a new Airport Commission was established in 1945; Donald Hines, who led the effort to build the airport, was the commission's director until he retired in 1973; he died in 1975. Scheduled east–west passenger service from United Airlines began in 1947, and north–south passenger service from Ozark Air Lines began in 1957. In 1969, the airport had 31 airline arrivals each weekday and recorded 353,000 passengers that year.

The present terminal designed by Brown, Healey, Bock Architects and Planners was dedicated in 1986 with a ceremony that U.S. Secretary of Transportation Elizabeth Dole attended. The Cedar Rapids Airport was renamed The Eastern Iowa Airport in 1997 to reflect its status as a regional airport. In 2008 the airport enplaned and deplaned one million passengers for the first time in its history; it set a record in 2017 with 1,143,335 passengers. In 2019, CID set an all-time record with 1,342,496 passengers served.

Airlines and destinations

Passenger

Cargo

Statistics

Annual traffic

Top destinations

Airport management 
 Marty Lenss: C.M., Airport Director
 Donald Swanson: Director of Finance & Administration
 Todd Gibbs: C.M., Director of Operations
 Pamela Hinman: Director of Marketing & Communications
 Kathleen Bell: Deputy Director of Finance & Administration

Accidents and incidents 
 August 30, 1970 – US Navy Blue Angels pilot Lt. Ernie Christensen belly-landed his F-4J Phantom at the Eastern Iowa Airport in Cedar Rapids with one engine stuck in afterburner during an airshow at the airport. He ejected safely, while the aircraft ran off the runway.
 July 11, 1975 – A Grumman G-159 Gulfstream I took off from Cedar Rapids to Dallas-Addison Airport in Dallas, Texas. The aircraft encountered heavy rain on short final, and attempted a go-around. The plane crashed on the runway on its second attempt to land. The probable cause was wind shear or sudden windshift. All occupants survived.

General aviation 
Scheduled airline traffic shares the Eastern Iowa Airport with cargo and general aviation traffic. Numerous nearby airports specialize in general aviation; the closest is Green Castle Airport.

See also
 List of airports in Iowa
 Cedar Rapids Transit

References 

 The Eastern Iowa Airport: History from The Eastern Iowa Airport's website, accessed February 26, 2006

External links 

The Eastern Iowa Airport (official site)

Airports in Iowa
Buildings and structures in Cedar Rapids, Iowa
Transportation buildings and structures in Linn County, Iowa
Transportation in Cedar Rapids, Iowa
1944 establishments in Iowa